The Abraham Van Ness homestead, Chatham, New York is a historical home (currently privately owned) and accompanying historical markers located on SR 66 near Old Chatham, NY.

It was the family home of Abraham Van Ness, which was built in 1749 by the early Dutch settlers at the foothills of the Berkshire Mountains. As indicated on the NYS Historical Marker, Abraham was the only Columbia County militiaman who died for the cause of the Revolution off the battlefield. Abraham was the son of John Van Ness, an early settler of the area. He had built his dwelling of stone which stands today as testimony to his skills at construction. Abraham and many of his relatives were a part of the Van Ness' Regiment of Militia, also known as the 9th Albany County Militia Regiment before Columbia County separated from that county.

Buildings and structures in Columbia County, New York